The 1974 Chicago White Sox season was the team's 74th season in the major leagues, and its 75th season overall. They finished with a record of 80–80, good enough for fourth place in the American League West, 9 games behind the first-place Oakland Athletics.

Offseason 
 October 14, 1973: Joe Keough was purchased from the White Sox by the Minnesota Twins.
 December 11, 1973: Steve Stone, Ken Frailing, Steve Swisher and a player to be named later were traded by the White Sox to the Chicago Cubs for Ron Santo. The White Sox completed the deal by sending Jim Kremmel to the Cubs on December 18.
 January 9, 1974: Kevin Bell was drafted by the White Sox in the 1st round of the 1974 Major League Baseball draft.
 January 16, 1974: John Lamb was purchased by the White Sox from the Pittsburgh Pirates.
 March 27, 1974: John Lamb was purchased from the White Sox by the Pirates.

Regular season

Opening Day lineup 
 Pat Kelly, RF
 Ken Henderson, CF
 Dick Allen, 1B
 Bill Melton, 3B
 Carlos May, LF
 Ron Santo, DH
 Jorge Orta, 2B
 Ed Herrmann, C
 Bucky Dent, SS
 Wilbur Wood, P

Season standings

Record vs. opponents

Notable transactions 
 April 15, 1974: Rich Hinton was signed as a free agent by the White Sox.
 July 11, 1974: Chuck Brinkman was purchased from the White Sox by the Pittsburgh Pirates.

Roster

Player stats

Batting 
Note: G = Games played; AB = At bats; R = Runs scored; H = Hits; 2B = Doubles; 3B = Triples; HR = Home runs; RBI = Runs batted in; BB = Base on balls; SO = Strikeouts; AVG = Batting average; SB = Stolen bases

Pitching 
Note: W = Wins; L = Losses; ERA = Earned run average; G = Games pitched; GS = Games started; SV = Saves; IP = Innings pitched; H = Hits allowed; R = Runs allowed; ER = Earned runs allowed; HR = Home runs allowed; BB = Walks allowed; K = Strikeouts

Farm system 

LEAGUE CHAMPIONS: Knoxville

Notes

References 
 
 1974 Chicago White Sox at Baseball Reference

Chicago White Sox seasons
Chicago White Sox season
Chicago